Cliff Taylor may refer to:

 Cliff Taylor (American football) (born 1952), former American football player for the Chicago Bears and Green Bay Packers
 Cliff Taylor (Australian footballer) (1914–1986), Australian rules footballer for Geelong
 Cliff Taylor (journalist), managing editor of The Irish Times
 Cliff Taylor (actor), American actor starring in Outlaw Women and Spitting Image

See also
Clifford Taylor (born 1942), American judge